Fourka may refer to the following places in Greece:

Fourka, a municipal unit in the Ioannina regional unit
Fourka, Chalkidiki, a village in Chalkidiki